The Conant family is a distinguished family of English origin.

History
The Conant surname is thought to be of Celtic, possibly Breton origin. The earliest known member of the most prominent line of the family was John Conant, a yeoman of East Budleigh, Devon. His son Richard (1548–1630), had eight children including his second son Robert (c. 1583–1638) and his youngest child Roger (c. 1592–1679). 

Robert Conant's eldest son the Rev. John Conant (1608–1694) was a noted theologian who was Regius Professor of Divinity and Vice-Chancellor of Oxford University. John Conant's great-grandson Nathaniel (1745–1822) served as Chief Magistrate of the Bow Street Magistrates' Court and was knighted in 1813. Nathaniel's great-great-grandson Sir Roger Conant, 1st Baronet (1899–1973) was a Conservative Party Member of Parliament (MP} who served as Comptroller of the Household from 1951–1954 and was created a baronet in 1954.

Roger Conant, the youngest child of Richard, emigrated to the Plymouth Colony in 1624, establishing the North American line of the Conant family. Disliking the increasingly repressive government at Plymouth, he soon left and was appointed the first governor of an English settlement on Cape Ann, subsequently founding the town of Salem, Massachusetts. There are numerous notable descendants of Roger.

The following genealogical tree illustrates the links among the more notable family members:

Family tree

Richard Conant (1548–1630)
Robert Conant (c. 1583–1638)
Rev. John Conant (1608–1694)
Robert Conant (1670–1756)
Rev. John Conant (1706–1779)
Sir Nathaniel Conant (1745–1822)
John Edward Conant (1777–1848)
Edward Nathaniel Conant (1820–1901)
Ernest William Proby Conant (1852–1920)
Sir Roger Conant, 1st Baronet (1899–1973)
Sir John Conant, 2nd Baronet (b. 1923)
Roger (c. 1592–1679)
Lot Conant (1624–1674)
Nathaniel Conant (1650–1732)
Nathaniel Conant (1679–1745)
Jeremiah Conant (1720–c. 1755)
Roger Conant (1748–1821)
Thomas Conant (1782–1838) 
Daniel Conant (1818–1879)
Thomas Conant (1842–1905)
Gordon Daniel Conant (1885–1953)
John Conant (1725–c. 1816)
Jeremiah Conant (1758–1828)
Thomas Conant (1807–1892)
James Scott Conant (1844–1922)
James Bryant Conant (1893–1978)
Theodore Richards Conant (1926–2015)
James F. Conant (b. 1958)
Jennet Conant (b. 1959)
John Conant (1652–1724)
Lot Conant (1679–1767)
Andrew Conant (b. 1703)
Andrew Conant (1725–1805)
Zebulon Conant (b. 1749)
Andrew Conant (1796–1877)
Lovander Wright Conant (1821–1898)
Alonzo H. Conant (1849–1919)
Frank Hall Conant (1880–1941)
Norman Francis Conant (1908–1984)
William Conant (1707–1756)
William Conant (1732–1804)
Levi Conant (1767–1842)
Levi Conant (1810–1892)
Sherman Conant (1839–1890)
Levi L. Conant (1857–1916)
William Conant (1667–c. 1754)
David Conant (1698–1789)
Jonathan Conant (1734–1820)
Josiah Conant (1768–1801)
Jonathan Conant (1793–1863)
Jonathan Josiah Conant (1823–1908)
Samuel Dimick Conant (1851–1936)
William Chester Conant (1884–1973)
David Perry Conant (1913–2005)
David Stoughton Conant (1949–2018)
Roger Conant (1668–1745)
Ebenezer Conant (1698–1794)
Ebenezer Conant (1743–1783)
John Conant (1773–1856)
Thomas Jefferson Conant (1802–1891) m. Hannah O'Brien Chaplin (1809–1865)
S. S. Conant (1831–?) m. Helen S. Conant (1839–1899)
Calvin Conant (1779–1829)
Charles Rich Conant (1807–1863) 
Carlos Conant Maldonado (1842–1907)

See also
Conant baronets
Conant

References

 Conant family
Scientific families
American families of English ancestry
Families from Massachusetts
English families
English gentry families